Ferdinando Piro (born 12 June 1977 in Italy) is an Italian footballer.

Career

For the 1995/96 season, Piro signed for Parma Calcio 1913 in the Serie A from A.S.G. Nocerina in the Serie C2. However, he suffered injuries during his stint there and was sent on loan to Aurora Pro Patria 1919. By 2001, he was playing in Serie D, the Italian fourth division. In the amateur leagues, Piro claimed "there is an impressive presumption, some people do not accept the fact that you can teach something and are only afraid that you will steal their place".

References

External links
 Ferdinando Pino at Carriere calciatori

Italian footballers
1977 births
Living people
Association football forwards
Association football midfielders
A.S.G. Nocerina players
Parma Calcio 1913 players
S.S.D. Varese Calcio players